Robert Richard Brower (born January 10, 1960) is a former Major League Baseball outfielder. He was born in Jamaica, New York. Bob attended college at Duke University on a football scholarship. and was signed by the Texas Rangers in 1982. Brower played four seasons in the majors, with the Texas Rangers (1986–1988) and the New York Yankees in 1989. He had 141 hits in 582 at bats, 17 home runs and 60 RBI. Brower attended James Madison High School in Vienna, Virginia and graduated in 1978. He lettered in football, basketball, baseball, and track during his time at Madison. Brower was the only athlete ever to letter in four sports in one year at James Madison High School.

Brower has served as the Vice President of the Scott Boras Corporation since 2000 - a professional sports player agent company that has represented players such as Barry Bonds, Alex Rodriguez, and Bernie Williams.

External links

Baseball players from New York (state)
Major League Baseball outfielders
New York Yankees players
Texas Rangers players
Duke Blue Devils baseball players
1960 births
Living people
Burlington Rangers players
Columbus Clippers players
Gulf Coast Rangers players
Mat-Su Miners players
Oklahoma City 89ers players
Tulsa Drillers players